The Commonwealth Caribbean is the region of the Caribbean with English-speaking countries and territories, which once constituted the Caribbean portion of the British Empire and are now part of the Commonwealth of Nations. The term includes many independent island nations, British Overseas Territories and some mainland nations. It is also known as the English-speaking Caribbean, Anglophone Caribbean, Anglo-Caribbean, or English-speaking West Indies. The term is now used in preference over the older term British West Indies, which was used to describe the British colonies in the West Indies during decolonisation and following independence from the United Kingdom. Anglo-Caribbean and British Commonwealth Caribbean also became preferred replacement terms to British West Indies.

Countries and territories 
The Commonwealth Caribbean consists of countries and territories, which include Caribbean islands or parts of mainland North and South America surrounding the Caribbean Sea.

Independent island countries 
There are ten independent island countries within the Commonwealth Caribbean:

Independent mainland countries 
There are two independent mainland countries within the Commonwealth Caribbean:

British Overseas Territories 
The term may also be applied to British Overseas Territories (BOTs) in the Caribbean, as they are also English-speaking and the United Kingdom is a member of the Commonwealth. However, other terms may also be used to specifically refer to these territories, such as "British overseas territories in the Caribbean", "British Caribbean territories" or the older term "British West Indies". There are 6 territories which are sometimes described as Commonwealth Caribbean:

Other non-Commonwealth Anglophone territories 
Since there are other non-Commonwealth Caribbean islands in which English is the primary or secondary language, the term Commonwealth Caribbean is not necessarily inclusive of all islands that encompass the English-speaking Caribbean, such as being a former or current British colony in the Caribbean. Accordingly, the terms Anglophone Caribbean, English-speaking Caribbean, Anglo-Caribbean, or English-speaking West Indies are also used.

West Indies Federation 

Between 1958 and 1962, there was a short-lived federation between several English-speaking Caribbean countries, called the West Indies Federation, which consisted of all the island nations (except the Bahamas), and the territories (excluding Bermuda and British Virgin Islands). British Guiana (Guyana) and British Honduras (Belize) held observer status within the federation.

The Commonwealth Caribbean makes up a composite cricket team. The West Indies cricket team also includes Guyana, as another former British colony, although it is located on the South American mainland. Bermuda, the U.S. and British Virgin Islands, and the Dutch Caribbean also participate in Anglophone Caribbean-related sports activities such as Twenty20 cricket.

Caribbean Community 

The English-speaking parts of the Caribbean established the Caribbean Community (CARICOM) in 1973, and it currently includes all the independent English-speaking island countries plus Belize, Guyana and Montserrat, as well as all other British Caribbean territories and Bermuda as associate members. English was its sole official language until 1995, following the addition of Dutch-speaking Suriname.

Informal Anglophone communities in Central America
In addition to these formally recognised countries, there are substantial communities of Commonwealth Caribbean origin along the Atlantic or Caribbean coast of Central America, as a part of the western Caribbean zone. These communities, which began forming in the seventeenth century, include areas of Nicaragua and Honduras that made up the Miskito Kingdom (which was under British protection after 1740), the Garifuna community (which was deported to the coast in 1797 and took up English as its language), the Archipelago of San Andrés, Providencia and Santa Catalina (Colombia), and the many and numerous Anglophone Caribbean people who were brought to Central America by the canal companies (the French and American Panama Canal efforts), railroad companies, and particularly the fruit companies, such as United Fruit after the 1870s and particularly in the first decades of the twentieth century.  Many have never fully integrated into the otherwise Spanish-speaking communities in which they reside, such as the Caracoles of Honduras.

See also

Anglo-America
British Empire
British North America
British West Indies
Caribbean Community
Caribbean English
English-speaking world
Languages of the Caribbean
West Indies cricket team
West Indies Federation

Other parts of the Caribbean
American Caribbean
Danish Caribbean
Dutch Caribbean
French Caribbean
Spanish Caribbean
Swedish Caribbean

Notes

Further reading
 Mawby, Spencer. Ordering Independence: The End of Empire in the Anglophone Caribbean, 1947–69 (Springer, 2012).
 U.S. Library of Congress – The Commonwealth Caribbean

Geography of the Caribbean
British West Indies
English-speaking countries and territories
English language in the Caribbean